The Conservatoire de musique du Québec à Saguenay is a music conservatory located in Saguenay, Quebec, Canada. The conservatory was opened in 1967 and is part of a network of 9 conservatories in Quebec, the Conservatoire de musique et d'art dramatique du Québec (CMADQ), and was the seventh school in the CMADQ network to be established. Approximately 85 pupils are enrolled at the conservatory. Pierre Bourque served as the school's director in 1972–1973.

External links
Conservatoire de Musique de Saguenay Website 

Conservatoire de musique et d'art dramatique du Québec
Government colleges in Quebec
Music schools in Canada
Educational institutions established in 1967
Education in Saguenay, Quebec